The Dana-i Menog-i khrat, (Persian:دانای مینوی خرد) or 'opinions of the spirit of wisdom', a Middle Persian book which was written about 8th century.
It comprises the replies of that spirit to sixty-two inquiries, or groups of inquiries, made by a certain wise man regarding various subjects connected with the Zoroastrian religion. This treatise contains about 11,000 words, and was long known, like the Shikand-gumanic Vichar (53), only through its Pazand version, prepared by a Persian zoroastrian writer, Neryosang in middle age. 

This book is translated to English by West in 1871. followed by a translation of the Pahlavi text in 1885.

Plot
The book contains the conversation between a wise man and the Spirit of Wisdom (Menog-i-Khrat), each on answers the other's questions in philosophical and religious matters.

See also
 Middle Persian
 Zoroastrianism
 Middle Persian literature

Further reading
 Kassock, Zeke J.V., (2013), Dadestan i Menog i Xrad: A Pahlavi Student's 2013 Guide,

References and bibliography

References
 https://web.archive.org/web/20180521073805/http://www.farvardyn.com/pahlavi4.php#54

External links
 www.avesta.com
 www.farvardyn.com

Persian literature
Persian language
Middle Persian literature
8th century in Iran